The Demolition Team are fictional characters, a team of mercenaries in the DC Comics universe. They first appeared in Green Lantern #176 (May 1984) and were created by Len Wein and Dave Gibbons.

Fictional character history
In their initial appearance, the Demolition Team were hired by Congressman Jason Bloch to destroy the Los Angeles branch of Ferris Aircraft. The Ferris employees were virtually defenseless against the team and their state-of-the-art weaponry provided by the Monitor. Help finally arrived in the form of the mysterious Predator who defeated the entire team unaided. It is assumed the Demolition Team were sent to prison soon after the incident.

The Demolition Team returned several years later with updated technology only to be handily defeated by the Blood Pack after attacking a nuclear power plant in Germany. Hardhat later appeared committing crimes in Opal City.

Rosie, together with several other scientific geniuses and cybernetic beings (Automan, Brainstorm, Doctor Cyber, Ford, and Emil Hamilton), was for a brief period part of the composite cybernetic being known as Enginehead. However (if this story is still canon), the being seems to have been divided into the individual personalities again shortly after the events of the series Enginehead #1-6 (2004).

Most of the team met their end at the hands of the OMACs during the events of The OMAC Project, but Hardhat was seen alive in Infinite Crisis #7. He is participating in the 'Battle of Metropolis', which was a supervillain first step to conquer the world.

Still later, Hardhat was seen among the "forgotten characters" of Limbo. Other notables include Ace the Bat-Hound, Geist, Gunfire and Merryman of the Inferior Five. As Merryman explains, Hardhat and all the other inhabitants came here to a realm of 'no stories' because they were forgotten about in the real world. They all are rescued by Superman and assist in the battle against the cosmic threat of Mandrakk.

Members
 Hardhat - A former heavyweight boxing palooka from New York City. His powered helmet and harness made him into a human juggernaut, currently a resident of Limbo.
 Jackhammer - A former oil rig worker from Houston. He carried a larger, more powerful version of a jackhammer capable of untold destruction. He is not to be confused with a similarly named character (real name Jackson Hammersmith) who employed an armor suit with two hydraulically charged hammer pistons against Superman while he had been weakened by Lord Satanus and Syren for a time.
 Rosie - Leader of the Demolition Team. A former, no-nonsense bar owner in New Orleans, she brandished a rapid-fire hot rivet gun.
 Scoopshovel - A former professional jai-alai player from San Diego. His hydraulic power-arm allowed him to dig up almost anything.
 Steamroller - A former motorcycle stunt rider from Chicago. He rode a compact version of a steamroller that could flatten buildings.

In other media

Television
 Steamroller makes non-speaking appearances in Teen Titans. This version is a namesake/construction equipment-themed android who initially appears as a member of H.I.V.E. before joining the Brotherhood of Evil.
 The Demolition Team appear in the Arrow episode "Code of Silence", consisting of Rosie (portrayed by Rachel Luttrell), Hardhat (portrayed by Marc Trottier), and Jackhammer portrayed by Daniel Cudmore). This version of the group are mercenaries who specialize in destroying buildings and wield regular equipment.

Miscellaneous
The Demolition Team appear in issue #43 of the Justice League Unlimited tie-in comic book series.

References

Comics characters introduced in 1984
DC Comics supervillain teams
Characters created by Len Wein